The Rolling Stones' 1966 Australian Tour was a concert tour of Australia and New Zealand by the band. The tour commenced on 18 February and concluded on 1 March 1966.

The Rolling Stones
Mick Jagger – lead vocals, harmonica, maracas
Keith Richards – guitar, backing vocals
Brian Jones – guitar, harmonica, organ on "That's How Strong My Love Is", backing vocals, tambourine
Bill Wyman – bass guitar, backing vocals
Charlie Watts – drums

Tour set list
Songs performed include:
Mercy, Mercy
She Said Yeah
Play With Fire
Not Fade Away
The Spider and the Fly
That's How Strong My Love Is
Get Off of My Cloud
19th Nervous Breakdown
(I Can't Get No) Satisfaction

Tour dates

*The shows in Sydney had The Searchers as a support act.

References
 Carr, Roy.  The Rolling Stones: An Illustrated Record.  Harmony Books, 1976.  

1966 in Australia
The Rolling Stones concert tours
1966 concert tours
1966 in New Zealand
Concert tours of Australia
Concert tours of New Zealand
1960s in New South Wales
1960s in Adelaide
1960s in Brisbane
1960s in Sydney
1960s in Auckland
1960s in Wellington
February 1966 events in New Zealand
March 1966 events in New Zealand
February 1966 events in Australia